Hédi «Balha» Berkhissa (28 June 1972 – 4 January 1997) was a Tunisian footballer who played for Espérance and the Tunisian National Team as a defender.

Early life
Berkhissa was born on the island of Kerkennah off the coast of Tunisia on 9 May 1972 to a Tunisian father and Algerian mother. In December of that year, he left with his family to settle in France but returned six years later to learn Arabic. Unable to settle, he later decided to move back to France only to return permanently to Tunisia with his family when he was 16. Having played football while living in France he joined his local team in the capital, Espérance.

Career
Berkhissa made his first appearance for Espérance when he was 18 years old. It was a dream debut on 31 January 1991 in the Tunis derby against local rivals Club Africain, with the game ending in a draw. He scored his first league goal for Espérance in the Tunis derby against Club Africain a game which ended in a 2-0 victory for Espérance. In total, Berkhissa made 98 league appearances for the club, scoring 9 goals. He also made 13 appearances in the Tunisian President Cup and made 24 appearances in African club competitions scoring 2 memorable goals in one game against Egyptian giants Al Zamalek.

Death
On 4 January 1997, in a friendly match between Espérance and French side Olympique Lyon at Stade Chedli Zouiten, Berkhissa had a heart attack on the field in the last minutes of the game and died.

Honours
 Chosen as the Tunisian Player Of the Year in 1995
 Chosen as the Arab Player Of the Year in 1995
 Won the Tunisian League three times with Espérance in 1991, 1993 and 1994
 Won the Tunisian President Cup once with Espérance in 1991
 Won the African Champions League once with Espérance in 1994
 Won the CAF Super Cup once with Espérance in 1995
 Won the Arab Club Champions Cup with Espérance in 1993
 Won the Afro-Asian Club Championship with Espérance in 1995
 Won the Arab Super Cup with Espérance in 1996
 Finalist of the African Cup of Nations once with Tunisia in 1996

References 

1972 births
1997 deaths
Tunisian footballers
Tunisia international footballers
Espérance Sportive de Tunis players
Association football players who died while playing
1996 African Cup of Nations players
Tunisian people of Algerian descent
Association football fullbacks
Sport deaths in Tunisia